Crambus ericella is a species of moth of the family Crambidae described by Jacob Hübner in 1813.

Distribution
This species can be found in most of Europe.

Description
Forewings are dark brown, with well defined white longitudinal streaks and a white apical triangle.

Biology
These moths fly in a single generation from May to September depending on the location. The larvae feed on Corynephorus canescens, Festuca ovina, Sorbus and Deschampsia flexuosa.

References

External links

  Waarneming.nl 
 Lepiforum.de

Crambini
Moths described in 1813
Moths of Europe